The following is a list of recordings of the music of the English composer Geoffrey Bush. The list includes discs dedicated to works by Bush, and also general compilations which include one or more of Bush's works. The dates of release do not necessarily reflect the dates of the recordings, some of which were made many years earlier.

References

Bush, Geoffrey